The Northern Izu Archipelago (or Islands) dialects (Japanese: 北部伊豆諸島方言 hokubu izu shoto hogen) are dialects of Japanese spoken on the inhabited islands north of Mikura-jima (Izu Ōshima, To-shima, Nii-jima, Shikine-jima, Kōzu-shima and Miyake-jima) in the Izu Archipelago, part of the Tokyo Metropolitan Area. The various dialects are classified as Eastern Japanese, and are most similar to the Izu dialect of mainland Honshū, but as islands have also developed unique traits which can vary considerably from island to island. On islands with large numbers of migrants from the mainland, such as To-shima, there is increasing standardisation of speech towards the common standard.

General features 
The following are general phonetic and grammatical features of the Northern Izu Archipelago dialects, with exceptions and individual variations listed in the island-specific sections.

Phonology 
The Northern Izu Archipelago dialects have a chūrin (中輪 ‘middle rim’) Tokyo standard pitch accent. The vowel sound /e/ is somewhat narrower than in traditional Tokyo dialects, and may lose its distinction with /i/ to become [i]. For example:

 eki (駅 train station) → iki 
 kebyō (仮病 feigning illness)→ kibyō
 fude (筆 writing brush) fudi
 tenki (天気 weather)→ tinki 
 sensei (先生 teacher) → shinshē 

In some dialects, there is a /tu/ syllable. For example: 

 tsurizao (釣り竿 fishing rod) → tuizao

Grammar 
Northern Izu Archipelago dialects are classified under Eastern Japanese, with similar grammar structures to Shizuoka and West Kantō dialects, but also with a strong influence from the traditional Yokohama dialect. As aforementioned, however, the differences from island to island can be extreme. Below are some notable grammatical traits.

 The conclusive auxiliary verb is the characteristic Eastern Japanese -da (だ).
 The connective form of u-ending Godan verbs experience small tsu (っ) insertion, whilst su-ending Godan verbs experience i-euphony. (The North Izu dialects are the furthest east this trait is found) 
 Bē (べ) (or bei (べい) on To-shima) is used for persuasion and volition. -U (-う) is also used for volition.
 For reasons, -kara (から) and -node (ので) are generally used, with exceptions on To-shima and Mikura-jima (listed below).

Izu Ōshima 

 On Izu Ōshima, pitch accent is based on the chūrin Tokyo standard but is not identical, rather a slight variation.
 The negative verb form is [-nai stem + nai (-ない)].
 For conjecture, zura (ずら) is used.
 The plain form of verbs appears as -n (-ん). For example) kuru (来る to come)→ kun (来ん), suru (する to do)→ shin (しん), neru (寝る to sleep)→ nen (寝ん).

Nii-jima 

 In the older generation of Nii-jima, /e/ is lengthened.
 In the Nii-jima Honmura dialect, the phonemes /ti/ and /di/ are also observed.

Mikura-jima 

 The negative verb form is [-nai stem + nee (ねぇ)].
 For conjecture, danbē (だんべぇ) and darō (だろう) are used.

Miyake-jima 

 In Tsubota, /e/ tends to change to an [i], with a particularly strong tendency to do so on the syllables ke (け) and re (れ). 
 The negative verb form is [-nai stem + nee (ねぇ) ].
 For conjecture, zura (ずら) and darō (だろう) are used.
 -nke (-んけ) is used as an equivalent to kara and node.

To-shima 

 The vowels in /ce/ and /co/ are pronounced close to an i and u, respectively. 
 The diphthong /ei/ is not merged and is pronounced [ei], so that sensei (先生 teacher) is not sensē but sensei.
 The negative verb form [nai-stem + n (ん) ] is used.
 For conjecture, dan’nō (だんのう) and darubei (だるべい) are used.
 -ni (-に) is used as an equivalent to kara and node.
 A distinction between the attributive and plain form of verbs can be seen. The attributive form ends with -o, whilst the plain form ends with a -u when particles like bei and na (な) are attached. For assertions, the verb ends with -o. For example: 
 iru (いる to be)→ iro (いろ)
 neru (寝る to sleep)→ nero (寝ろ)
 suru (する to do)→ shiro (しろ)
 shite iru (している is doing)→ shitero (してろ)
 kaku (書く to write)→ kako (書こ).
 The Western Japanese past negative form -zatta (-ざった was not) is found.

References 

Izu Islands
Japanese dialects